William Floyd Millet (October 17, 1911 – June 17, 2000) was an American football and basketball player, track and field athlete, coach of various sports, and college athletics administrator.  Millet served as the head football coach at Brigham Young University (BYU) for one season in 1942, tallying a mark of 2–5.  He was the head basketball coach at BYU from 1941 to 1949, compiling a record of 104–77.  From 1963 to 1970, he served as the school's athletic director.

Millet was born in Mesa, Arizona and graduated from Mesa Union High School there.  After attending Gila Junior College —now known as Eastern Arizona College— in Thatcher, Arizona, he moved on to BYU, where he lettered in basketball, football, and track, before graduating in 1934. In football and basketball, he earned all-conference honors.  Millet received a master's degree from the University of Southern California (USC) in 1939.

Millet began his coaching career at Davis High School in Kaysville, Utah, where he spent three years as head coach in football and baseball and an assistant in basketball. He returned to BYU in 1937 as an assistant football coach.

Personal life
Millet was married to Vera Jackson. They met during their mutual time at Brigham Young University (1929–1934). They were married by President George Albert Smith on August 13, 1934 and remained together for 66 years until Floyd's death in 2000. Vera lived to be 98, dying in 2007. According to her obituary, she "was a wonderful companion to Floyd throughout his coaching and athletic career and was always with him for the innumerable "away" games, meetings and other travels. She loved sports and knew teams, players and scores. She was the ultimate True Blue BYU Fan, seldom missing a football or basketball game, even in her 98th year." Both were active members of The Church of Jesus Christ of Latter-day Saints.

Head coaching record

College football

References

External links
 

1911 births
2000 deaths
American football fullbacks
American men's basketball players
Forwards (basketball)
BYU Cougars athletic directors
BYU Cougars football coaches
BYU Cougars football players
BYU Cougars men's basketball coaches
BYU Cougars men's basketball players
BYU Cougars men's track and field athletes
BYU Cougars track and field coaches
High school baseball coaches in the United States
High school basketball coaches in Utah
High school football coaches in Utah
Eastern Arizona College alumni
Mesa High School alumni
University of Southern California alumni
Sportspeople from Mesa, Arizona
Coaches of American football from Arizona
Players of American football from Arizona
Basketball coaches from Arizona
Basketball players from Arizona
Track and field athletes from Arizona